Daniel Kleinman (born 23 December 1955) is a British television commercial and music video director who has designed every title sequence for the James Bond series of films since GoldenEye (1995), with the exception of Quantum of Solace (2008) (which was designed by the filmmaking and design collective MK12). He returned to design the titles for Skyfall (2012), Spectre (2015), and No Time to Die (2021).

Early life
He attended Orange Hill Grammar School in north-west London, which became Mill Hill County High School.

Career
Kleinman formed Bazooka Joe, a rock band, with John Ellis and friends from Orange Hill Grammar School, Burnt Oak, London. The band played extensively throughout the 1970s. In 1975 it was supported by the Sex Pistols, playing for the first time at St Martin's School of Art, London. Bazooka Joe had a varied changing line up of musicians, notably Adam Ant and Arabella Weir, Mark Tanner (Sculptor), Chris Duffy (photographer).

Prior to Bond films, Kleinman directed music videos for musicians such as Madonna, Fleetwood Mac, Paula Abdul, Simple Minds, Wang Chung, Adam Ant and many others. Between 1984 and 1987, Kleinman's work received a record five nominations for the MTV Video Music Award for Most Experimental Video, as well as three nominations for Best Direction and several other categories. His 1989 James Bond-inspired video for Gladys Knight's title song to Licence to Kill led to him being chosen as the replacement when regular Bond title designer Maurice Binder died in 1991. In addition to the titles, Kleinman also directed the music videos for Sheryl Crow's Tomorrow Never Dies title song and Billie Eilish's No Time to Die title song.

Kleinman has directed many television commercials for companies ranging from Smirnoff's Sea and Guinness' noitulovE, to pieces for Levi's, Johnnie Walker, Durex and Audi. He also directed the iconic Boddington’s commercials featuring Melanie Sykes.

Kleinman also directed Harry Enfield and Paul Whitehouse in Smashie and Nicey, End of an Era.

James Bond
Kleinman's appointment as title designer for the James Bond films placed greater emphasis on the use of modern technologies (such as computer-generated images) into the creation of the series' title sequences, as well as an arguably greater emphasis on the integration of elements of each film's respective plots within the musical sequences.

To elaborate:

 The titles for GoldenEye feature a two-faced woman, an allusion to the god Janus, the namesake of a character and his terrorist organisation in the film. The sequence also includes imagery of the usual scantily clad women tearing down Soviet monuments, physically destroying Communist iconography, which bridges the gap between the cold open pre-credits sequence/teaser set during the Cold War and the remainder of the film, set after the fall of the Soviet Union. A key sequence later in the film is set in a Russian dumping ground full of such damaged and redundant statues of Vladimir Lenin and Joseph Stalin.
 The Tomorrow Never Dies title sequence turns the Bond women into anthropomorphic symbols of technology, specifically circuitry and communications to illustrate the plot's concerns with the power of the mass media. Satellites in orbit becoming diamonds is reminiscent of Binder's sequence for Diamonds Are Forever.
 The titles for The World Is Not Enough feature, appropriately, images of the globe, massed ranks of pumping oil derricks and the usual silhouettes of women actually forming from oil, making use of the rainbow effect of oil on water, and reflecting the storyline's central theme of the exploitation of the natural resource.
 Die Another Day'''s titles further integrate plot elements by advancing the story (something not literally seen since Dr. Nos titles) by illustrating Bond (Pierce Brosnan) being tortured during his lengthy imprisonment in North Korea, complete with beatings, dunkings and scorpion stings. For the first time, the traditional shapely women are represented negatively as 'elementals' – water, electricity and extremes of hot and cold all employed in the torture.
 For the titles of Casino Royale, the women are entirely absent – for the first time since Dr. No – on request by director Martin Campbell. Kleinman's unique sequence replaces the characteristic silhouettes of naked 'lovelies' with angular ones of men (achieved via rotoscoping) – specifically Bond in silhouette and a series of colourful attackers whom he dispatches as he works his way to Double-0 status, again advancing the plot. It is all set against a stylised background of casino and card-game symbolism to reflect the central theme and the poker game scenes in the film, and is reminiscent of the original paperback cover for the novel. The only women to appear are the film's Bond girl, Vesper Lynd, glimpsed as the pack's Queen of Hearts among the cross-hairs/roulette wheels, and HM The Queen on British £10 bank notes. The sequence concludes with a focus on Bond's (Daniel Craig) ice-cold blue eyes.
 After being absent for Quantum of Solace, Kleinman returned to design the titles for Skyfall. This features the return of the scantily-clad silhouetted women, although in a sparing role and nowhere near the number seen in title sequences prior to Casino Royale. There is, again, a repeating emphasis of Bond's blue eyes, and a sniper wound in Bond's chest (accidentally inflicted in the pre-credits sequence by Eve Moneypenny and Patrice). The remainder features Bond moving through multiple surreal environments, including a graveyard, a hall of mirrors, a riverbed, and Skyfall itself (the Bond family estate). Chinese lanterns (representing the portion set in Shanghai and after in Macau), target circles from an indoor shooting range with Bond's face, and the film's principal villain, Silva, also make an appearance; the sequence also features Silva's calling card, a red skull. The final portion recalls the film's title, with the sky quite literally falling: pistols, swords and daggers rain down on an apocalyptic rendition of the graveyard, before the sequence again concludes, as in Casino Royale, with a close zoom on Bond's eyes.
Kleinman once again returned to direct the title sequence of the twenty-fourth Bond film, Spectre. The sequence contains a heavy emphasis on the Octopus of the SPECTRE logo, with the tentacles appearing in nearly every scene in the sequence symbolising the control of the organisation in Bond's life. Imagery of previous Bond villains and friends appear including Raoul Silva, Le Chiffre, Vesper Lynd and M as played by Judi Dench all being reflected on shattered glass. Several scenes from the film appear in the sequence with tentacles appearing from the shadows, a further sequence showing the funeral scene with tentacles replacing the church also appears with Franz Oberhauser appearing as the source of the tentacles.
For Craig's final Bond film No Time to Die, the sequence opens with a homage to  the original title sequence designer, Maurice Binder with references to the coloured dots that appeared during the credit sequence of Dr. No.'' The key themes of the sequence "are betrayal, and time," with numerous images of hourglasses and clocks throughout. The hourglasses represent all the time in the world, but when they are broken so is Bond’s heart thinking (wrongly) that Madeleine Swann has betrayed him. Images of Vesper Lynd are included alongside Madeleine, in order to tie her in with Vesper in the audience’s mind as both deceiving Bond. Images of Bond's Aston Martin DB5 sinking into an abyss and a statue of Britannia crumbling and dropping her shield are used to represent Bond's withdrawal from his old life and retirement from serving Queen and Country. DNA strands made up of Walther PPKs are also seen to reflect the movie's plot involving DNA coded nanobots. The  start of the sequence contains "muted colors and natural tones" to reflect Bond's broken heart before becoming brighter and uplifting towards the end "which symbolizes him getting his mojo back."

References

External links

MVDB entry

Living people
Film and television title designers
English film directors
English music video directors
Advertising directors
1955 births
Bazooka Joe (band) members